Pyar Ke Do Pal is a 1986 Indian Hindi-language film directed by Rajiv Mehra, starring Mithun Chakraborty, Jaya Prada, Simple Kapadia, Krishan Dhawan, Jagdeep, Tiku Talsania, Lalita Pawar and Anjan Srivastav.

Plot

Pyaar Ke Do Pal is a family drama, featuring Mithun Chakraborty, Jayapradha and Simple Kapadia , supported by Krishan Dhawan, Lalita Pawar, Jagdeep, Tiku Talsania and Anjan Srivastav.

Summary

Twins Sunil and Anil live with their father Ashok Choudhary and mother Geeta Choudhary respectively as per court order. The children meet each other at Scout camp and decides to re-unite their parents. The parents had a misunderstanding on an abortion issue as Geeta Choudhary mentioned her name to help her friend Rajni Thakur get married. The climax reveals the exact issue and whether they sort everything out.

Cast

Mithun Chakraborty ...  Ashok Choudhary
Jayapradha ...  Geeta Choudhary
Simple Kapadia ...  Rajni Thakur
Krishan Dhawan ...  Geeta's dad
Jagdeep ...  Scout Master
Bindu ...  Paro
Satyendra Kapoor ...  Viren Thakur
Shubha Khote ...  Mary Amma
Amrit Pal ...  Amrit
Lalita Pawar ...  Paro's mom
Anjan Srivastav ...  Dr. Mehta
Tiku Talsania ...  Lakhan
Ashutosh Thakur (child Artist) ... Anil and Sunil (Dual Role)

Music
"Pyar Ke Do Pal" - Shabbir Kumar, Baby Munmi
"Kabse Tadap Rahe Hai Kuch Khyal Kijiye" - Dilraj Kaur
"Main Hoon Main, Tu Hai Tu" - Baby Munmi
"Mere Daddy Kitne Pyare Hai" - Baby Munmi, Shabbir Kumar
"Daddy Yaad Aate Hai" - Kavita Krishnamurthy, Baby Munmi

External links
 
 Pyar Ke Do Pal, IBOS

1986 films
1980s Hindi-language films
Indian action films
Films scored by Anu Malik
1986 action films